Kenai Lake (Dena'ina: Sqilan Bena) is a large, "zig-zag" shaped lake on the Kenai Peninsula, Alaska. The lake forms the headwaters of the Kenai River, and is itself a destination for fishing and other outdoor activity. The Dena'ina call the lake Sqilan Bena, meaning "ridge lake place". Due to its size and shape it is accessible from both the Sterling Highway and the Seward Highway.

See also
List of lakes of Alaska

References

External links
Panoramic view of the lake from Cooper Landing

Lakes of Kenai Peninsula Borough, Alaska
Lakes of Alaska
Kenai Mountains-Turnagain Arm National Heritage Area